Si Ouey or Si Uey Sae-Ung, commonly spelled Si Quey and whose actual name was Huang Lihui, was a Sino-Thai gardener who became best known as a convicted serial killer. Si Ouey was accused of killing several children throughout the 1950s before being arrested in 1958 and executed in 1959. According to some sources, Si Ouey was allegedly the first serial killer in the history of modern Thailand. Many believe him to be innocent of the charges and a victim of anti-Chinese sentiment in 20th-century Thailand.

Biography 
Much of Si Ouey's history is unknown; the Thai department of corrections was never contacted by a family member, and as of 2020 Si Ouey was considered stateless. One source states that Si Ouey was born in Shantou, China in 1927, and that he later fought during the Second Sino-Japanese War. According to Thai government records, Si Ouey engaged in cannibalism during the war, eating parts of his fellow soldiers when supplies ran low during a siege. He emigrated to Thailand after the war. Today, it is generally agreed that the cannibalism accusations against Si Ouey were false.

During the 1950's, Si Ouey worked in a number of menial roles (several sources describe him as a gardener) before allegedly beginning his killings. From 1954 to 1958, Si Ouey was accused of killing several (sources disagree on whether four, five, or six) Thai children, allegedly disemboweling, boiling, and eating his victims. Active in Bangkok, Nakhon Pathom, and Rayong, Si Ouey was arrested (reportedly while attempting to burn a body) by Thai police in 1958 after which he purportedly confessed to the murders. According to Thai records, Si Ouey confessed to police that he targeted children as they were easier to lure. He also allegedly admitted to enjoying the taste of human flesh, but later denied being a cannibal. He was tried, sentenced to death, and executed by firing squad in 1959 at the age of 31. Si Ouey's remains were preserved and used for medical testing before being embalmed and put on display at Siriraj Medical Museum in Bangkok. 
  
Many have called into question his confession and trial. Several note that Si Ouey spoke no Thai and as such may not have given an accurate confession, and that he was forced to use a translator during his trial. Anti-Chinese, anti-communism, and anti-immigrant sentiment may have also played a role in Si Ouey's trial. A campaign by humanitarian activists successfully campaigned for Si Ouey's corpse to be removed from display in August 2019, and in July 2020 his remains were cremated at Wat Bang Phraek Tai temple.

See also 
 List of serial killers by country

References 

20th-century executions by Thailand
1920s births
1959 deaths
1959 in Thailand
Executed Thai people
Executed serial killers
Male serial killers
Mummies
People executed by Thailand by firearm
Thai serial killers
People convicted of murder by Thailand
Thai people convicted of murder
Murderers of children
Chinese people executed abroad